Michael John Yadan Tumanguil Pestano Bustos (born June 23, 1981) is a Filipino-Canadian YouTuber, vlogger, singer, and comedian who has appeared on the reality television show Canadian Idol. He is also the owner of AntsCanada, a YouTube channel and accompanying online shop that specialize in ant-keeping.

Early life
Bustos was born to Filipino parents in the Weston neighbourhood of Toronto, Ontario. Before Canadian Idol, he worked as a temp at the Bank of Montreal. He attended St. Michael's College School in Toronto.

Canadian Idol 
Bustos placed seventh runner-up in the finals of first season of Canadian Idol in August 2003, despite Chart magazine's prediction: "If we were to lay our bets today, ChartAttack’s money would be on Toronto contestant Mikey Bustos, a slightly strange-looking young man with a shaved head and the voice of an angel."

Bustos recorded with BMG Music Canada and ViK. Recordings for the Canadian Idol compilation album, which was certified gold on the Soundscan Billboard charts on second day of release, and ranked in the Top 5 best selling Canadian albums in its debut week, selling over 60,000 units nationwide.

Post Idol 
After competing on Canadian Idol, Bustos began performing throughout Canada and the US at many events and showcases at top venues.

Career 

In 2004, Bustos recorded, performed, and mastered his craft in New York City residing in Queens and Manhattan, collaborating and recording with producer Glenn Swan of the Chung King Studios.

In 2005, Bustos released his debut extended play entitled Love Me Again on May 7. It was produced by Brent Bodrug of B-Group Music, who previously had worked with Alanis Morissette, Jack Soul, and Sugar Jones.

In 2006, Bustos continued touring in the U.S. performing in New York, Chicago, Los Angeles, San Diego, and Las Vegas. He also began to perform in other countries, traveling to the Philippines, where he was front act for the Pussycat Dolls. Mikey also had a series of guest appearances, interviews, and live performances on popular Philippine TV shows including ABS-CBN's ASAP '06, and GMA-7's Eat Bulaga, StarTalk, SOP, S-Files, Unang Hirit, SIS, MTV Philippines, and even the country's first Philippine Idol. Mikey's radio performances and mall performance at Eastwood City in Manila were also highlights.

In 2007, Bustos was featured in a commercial for MTV Canada & was the front act for Christina Aguilera in the Philippines on July 6. He released a music video the next year for his single "If It Feels Good Then We Should" from his debut solo album Memoirs of a Superhero. The album was released on December 23, 2008, and its album art was designed by Orange Pop Media.

In 2009, Bustos' single "If It Feels Good Then We Should" reached Top 20 for multiple weeks on Canadian mainstream radio, as well as Top 2 Music Video on the California Music Channel in the US. His single "All I Need Is Me" was also played at Footlocker Stores nationwide. Under Bustos Entertainment Inc, he signed with Universal Music/North Fontana Distribution in May 2009.

In 2010, Bustos was nominated for a Toronto Independent Music Award for Best Adult Contemporary category. His song "Everytime My Heart Beats" from his debut album "Memoirs of a Superhero" since its release has become a YouTube phenomenon. Mikey was also involved in musical theater projects including a star role in the Summerworks production of Prison Dancer: The Musical.

Bustos continues to tour the world performing and making guest appearances on TV, radio, and the internet. In January 2014, Bustos joined the cast of the morning radio show Good Times with Mo on Magic 89.9 in the Philippines.

Bustos is also the owner of AntsCanada, an ant store based in Toronto that sells ant-keeping supplies made by Bustos in Manila.

In 2017, Bustos currently hosts his own TV show Mikey Bustos: Your Pinoy Boy Vlogserye which is currently aired on Philippine regional station CLTV 36 (based in Pampanga).

In 2019, Mikey Bustos surprised his fans and followers as he announced that he is part of the LGBT community. Bustos publicly came out on social media on Easter Sunday, April 21.

YouTube videos
Bustos is known for his videos uploaded on video website YouTube. He made international headlines in March 2014 for his cover of Avicii's 'Wake Me Up' in which he performed an a cappella number with ten parts. Bustos is very open about his Filipinophilia, his popular videos cover a wide range of topics including "Filipinism", Philippine English phonology and Filipino culture tutorials such as eating Balut (duck embryo), Filipino dining, Filipino courting, and the Filipino CR. He also made a parody of "Born This Way" by Lady Gaga entitled "Pinoy This Way" and has many more based on various trending pop songs. He has appeared on television news several times: TV Patrol and Bandila on ABS-CBN; and 24 Oras and Saksi on GMA.

AntsCanada
Bustos also runs another YouTube channel, AntsCanada, where he uploads videos about antkeeping, with his videos mostly involving his personal colonies. Regular updates feature his own colonies, such as yellow crazy ants, fire ants, and asian bullet ants, as well as several other examples. He is also continuing his 'Antopia' series of videos including 'Native ants vs. Invasive ants' and 'Discovering ant #555'. He has also bought several acres of land and plans to use them as a wildlife reserve for ants and various other native animals. In addition to the YouTube channel, Bustos also has an online store with the goal of making antkeeping fun and easy. As well as AntsCanada T-shirts, the store sells formicariums and ant keeping equipment. Queen ants and colonies are also available through AntsCanada's Global Ant Nursery Project, which enables users to buy and sell live ants locally.

Personal life
Bustos came out as bisexual on April 22, 2019 via Instagram. He also disclosed that he is in a relationship with RJ Garcia, who is also his manager.

Product endorsements 
In 2011, Bustos became the spokesperson and endorser for brands like Samsung, Nescafé, and the Mang Juan snacks. His TV commercials for Chicharron ni Mang Juan run on Philippine television on all major networks nationwide.

Television

Awards

References

External links 
 mikeybustosvideos.com
 
www.antscanada.com

1981 births
Living people
Canadian musicians of Filipino descent
Canadian expatriates in the Philippines
Canadian Idol participants
Canadian radio personalities
Canadian YouTubers
Filipino YouTubers
Canadian LGBT singers
LGBT YouTubers
Bisexual men
Filipino LGBT singers
20th-century Canadian LGBT people
21st-century Canadian LGBT people